Coquihalla Canyon Provincial Park, popularly called the Othello Tunnels is a provincial park located near Hope, British Columbia focused on the canyon of the Coquihalla River and a decommissioned railway grade, now a walking trail, leading eventually to Coquihalla Pass.  Originally part of the Kettle Valley Railway, five tunnels and a series of bridges follow a relatively straight line through the gorge, which is lined with sheer, flat rock cliffs.

History
It was expanded to its current  in 2004.

As of May 2015, the tunnels were reopened after having been closed for over a year due to rockfall concerns.

During the 2021 Southern British Columbia floods, the rising waters of the Coquihalla river combined with debris to cause flooding in at least one tunnel section, and destruction of much of the approach trail from the park’s main access point.

In the media
The park's rock cliffs and relatively close distance to Vancouver has resulted in many popular movies being filmed there. First Blood, Shoot to Kill, Far from Home: The Adventures of Yellow Dog, Cabin in the Woods and War for the Planet of the Apes were all filmed in Coquihalla Canyon.

See also
Coquihalla River Provincial Park

References

External links 
Touring the Kettle Valley Railway - Othello Tunnels
Hiking the Othello Tunnels and the Hope-Nicola Valley Trail

Provincial parks of British Columbia
Canyons and gorges of British Columbia
Canadian Cascades
Lower Mainland
1986 establishments in British Columbia
Protected areas established in 1986
Landforms of Lower Mainland